Symphlebia similis is a moth in the subfamily Arctiinae. It was described by Rothschild in 1917. It is found in Peru.

References

Moths described in 1917
Symphlebia